Myron Mixon (born May 31, 1962) is an American celebrity chef and competitor on the competitive barbecue circuit. He is a five time barbecue World Champion and appeared as a judge on Destination America reality television show BBQ Pitmasters. He also appeared as a judge on the bbq show Smoked as well as the show BBQ Pit Wars. Due to the number of accolades he has achieved during his BBQ career, he has the nickname of "the winningest man in barbecue."

Career
Myron started in competitive barbecue in 1996 at a competition in Atlanta, Georgia. He won first place in whole hog and third place in the pork shoulder competition. He originally only took up competitive BBQ in order to promote his family's BBQ sauce which his parents, Gaye and Jack, had created. His father taught him how to barbecue, and Myron named his BBQ company after him, calling it Jack's Old South.

During the course of his career, Myron has won more than 180 BBQ grand championships and over 1,700 BBQ trophies. He has been named Grand Champion at the Memphis in May World Championship on five occasions: in 2001, 2004, 2007, 2016, and 2021. Myron is a multi-time Big Pig Jig Grand Champion, having won it most recently in 2012, his third victory in a row.  He has so far failed to win the Jack Daniel's BBQ World Invitational, which he has described as the most prestigious competition in the BBQ circuit. He was runner up in 2004, missing out on first place by 0.1 points, and has come first in the whole hog competition there on three occasions. His achievements have earned him the nickname "the winningest man in barbecue."

Myron debuted on TLC's reality television show BBQ Pitmasters in its inaugural series as a contestant. Originally, it was a show that followed a number of BBQ chefs to several different BBQ competitions. Series two brought a change in format, with it becoming a competition-game show, and Mixon serving one of the three judges alongside Art Smith and Warren Sapp. Series three saw the series move to the Destination America cable TV channel and a slight change in the format. Mixon was the only judge who remained on the show, being joined by fellow BBQ chefs Aaron Franklin and Tuffy Stone.

He signed a cookbook deal in 2010 with publishers Ballantine Books. It was published in 2011, with Paula Deen providing the foreword. In May 2012, he appeared on NBC's The Today Show in a BBQ cookoff against Pat Martin of Tennessee restaurant Martin's Bar-B-Que. Myron cooked a brisket recipe while Martin cooked "red neck tacos."

Mixon was elected mayor of his hometown of Unadilla, Georgia, and was sworn in for a four-year term in January 2016.

Published works
Smokin' with Myron MixonMyron Mixon, Alexander, Kelly (May 10, 2011) 192 pages New York: Ballantine Books. 
Everyday Barbecue: At Home with America's Favorite PitmasterMyron Mixon, Alexander, Kelly (May 7, 2013) 320 pages
Myron Mixon's BBQ RulesMyron Mixon, Alexander, Kelly (April 19, 2016) 240 pages

Restaurants
In January 2017 Mixon, along with business partners Joe Corey, a certified BBQ judge, and Bill McFadden opened Myron Mixon’s Pitmaster BBQ in Alexandria Virginia. The restaurant features some of Myron’s famous menu items such as Jacks Peach BBQ Baked Beans, Baby Back Mac and Cheese, Dry Rubbed Wings, and many more of Myron’s favorites cooked up by head pitmaster John Bennett.

References

External links

Jack's Old South BBQ official website
Myron Mixon 100% Organic BBQ Pellets: Harvested in the USA
Where tradition meets innovation — Myron Mixon handcrafted Smokers: Made in the USA. 

Living people
1962 births
People from Vienna, Georgia
American television chefs
Barbecue chefs
Chefs from Georgia (U.S. state)
American male chefs